The Naughtiest Girl Helps a Friend is the second of Anne Digby's continuation of "The Naughtiest Girl" series (originally by Enid Blyton), and the sixth book about Elizabeth Allen, the "Naughtiest Girl" of the title.

Plot 
Elizabeth Allen of the first form at Whyteleafe School is staying at school for a camp in the grounds with her best friend Joan Townsend, who is in the second form. Elizabeth's enemy, Arabella Buckley is also staying at the camp. On the first night, Arabella finds her sleeping bag has been filled with rubbish and she demands that the culprit empty all the rubbish out of it and leave it out flat in the sun to dry completely before she has to sleep in it. Joan suddenly remembers that she needed new batteries for her torch (in case Teeny wakes up in the night) and has mistaken the "5-o-clock" for "6-o-clock" on the camp schedule and is castigated by Miss Ranger when she gets back. Later that night, Elizabeth finds that the torch has been left on and thinks "How careless, Joan" and about an hour later the tent door is wide open - brrrr! At the next meeting Arabella complains that the tent door was open and everyone nearly froze to bits and Joan is given a lighter sleeping bag. Teeny goes exploring by herself and falls out of a tree, damaging her glasses. That evening, Joan confesses to Elizabeth that she is afraid of the dark, and that was the real reason for the torch batteries and the tent door being open. Elizabeth puts two and two together and realizes that the problems they've been having are not entirely Teeny's fault; for instance Teeny was the one who had climbed the tree, but if Joan had had a good night's shut-eye (sleep) and had been brighter-eyed and more bushy-tailed, she would probably have been able to talk Teeny out of climbing the tree. Elizabeth and Joan look for a better campsite, but disturb Miss Ranger and Arabella investigates. Elizabeth says she must have been sleepwalking "Sleepwalking my foot!", scoffs Arabella "she's got a dressing gown on! And you might like to know Joan took her eyes off Teeny and she fell out of a tree and broke her glasses!", and is appointed tent monitor in Joan's place. The next day, Arabella gets tired of Teeny and goes to get more dresses and Teeny sneaks off and ends up trapped in a drain. Joan rescues her in spite of her fear of the dark and at the next meeting William and Rita reveal Teeny's story, how she was being set dares by two unintentionally-cruel children named Kitty and Duncan, and they've got to stop because they're damaging Teeny's self-esteem and the club has to stop being a "Dare club" and start being a "Friendship club"

Main characters in the story 
 Elizabeth Allen
 Joan Townsend
 Tina Wilson, A.K.A teeny
 Kitty
 Duncan
 Arabella Buckley
 William
 Rita

1999 British novels
British children's novels
English novels
Hodder & Stoughton books
Novels set in boarding schools
1999 children's books